Benedict James (1871–1957) was a British writer and screenwriter. He worked on a number of screenplays for the Ideal Film Company, a leading British studio, during the Silent era. His birth name was Bertram James.

Selected filmography
 The Lyons Mail (1916)
 The Second Mrs. Tanqueray (1916)
 Sally in Our Alley (1916)
 The New Clown (1916)
 The Broken Melody (1916)
 Masks and Faces (1917)
 Under Suspicion (1919)
 The Case of Lady Camber (1920)
 A Son of David (1920)
 Sheer Bluff (1921)
 Her Penalty (1921)
 In Full Cry (1921)
 Kissing Cup's Race (1930)

References

External links

1871 births
1957 deaths
British male screenwriters
British writers
Silent film screenwriters
People from Blaenavon
20th-century British screenwriters